El 0597 está ocupado ("0597 is busy") was a Colombian telenovela produced in 1959 by Producciones PUNCH. It is considered the first Colombian telenovela. It is based on an Argentinian radio play from 1950, "0597 da ocupado".

Synopsis
A man mistakenly calls a women's prison. One of the women answers, beginning a telephone romance. After being discovered, the telephone is disconnected so that the man always finds the line to be busy. The two marry after the woman exits the prison.

Remakes
Two further remakes were done: one in 1990 (Una voz en el teléfono, produced for Argentina's Canal 9) and one in 1997 (Alguna vez tendremos alas, produced by Mexico's Televisa).

References

1950s Colombian television series
1959 Colombian television series debuts
1959 Colombian television series endings
Colombian telenovelas